Marcos Daniel was the defending champion, but chose to not compete this year.
Alejandro Falla defeated Horacio Zeballos 6–3, 6–4 in the final.

Seeds

Draw

Final four

Top half

Bottom half

References
 Main Draw
 Qualifying Draw

Seguros Bolivar Open Cali - Singles
2009 Singles